David R. Carlin Jr. (born 1938) is an American politician, author, and professor of sociology and philosophy.

Life and career
Born in Pawtucket, Rhode Island, Carlin has resided in Newport since 1972. He was a Democratic majority leader of the Rhode Island Senate.

His total period of service in the state Senate ran from 1981 to 1993. He made an unsuccessful bid for the Rhode Island's 1st congressional district in 1992. In 2012, he made a bid to return to the Rhode Island legislature, but was decisively defeated in a Democratic primary for the Rhode Island House of Representatives. He remains a registered Democrat but is strongly opposed to abortion and same-sex marriage.

He served 12 years on the Newport School Committee and was at one time the chair of the Newport Democratic Party.

Carlin is the author of five books: The Decline and Fall of the Catholic Church in America (2003), Can a Catholic Be a Democrat? (2006), Homosexualism versus Catholicism (2012),My Dear Bishops: an Open Letter to the American Catholic Bishops (2013), and Three Sexual Revolutions: Catholic ~ Protestant ~ Atheist (2022).  He has been an opinion columnist for two Catholic periodicals (Commonweal and Our Sunday Visitor) and two Catholic websites (Crisis and Aleteia).

Carlin has been a full-time professor at the Community College of Rhode Island since 1984. He was a professor of sociology and philosophy at the Newport campus of CCRI.

On June 11, 2019, Carlin attracted controversy when he authored an op-ed in The Providence Journal attacking the Equality Act as redundant given that the state already includes the LGBTQ community in its civil rights statutes, and in opposition to transgender athletes participating in sports on their chosen rather than biological identity, referring to them as the "weirdest members of society" and disruptive of sporting events and normal childhood development.

References

Living people
American Roman Catholics
Roman Catholic writers
Democratic Party Rhode Island state senators
1938 births
Politicians from Pawtucket, Rhode Island
Politicians from Newport, Rhode Island